The 2011–12 UNC Wilmington Seahawks men's basketball team represented the University of North Carolina Wilmington during the 2011–12 NCAA Division I men's basketball season. The Seahawks, led by second year head coach Buzz Peterson, played their home games at the Trask Coliseum and were members of the Colonial Athletic Association.

Roster

Schedule

|-
!colspan=9| Regular Season

|-
!colspan=9| 2012 CAA men's basketball tournament

References

UNC Wilmington Seahawks men's basketball seasons
Unc Wilmington